Dirk Peter Balster (born 19 July 1966, in Gütersloh) is a German rower. He finished 4th in the coxless four at the 1992 Summer Olympics.

References

External links
 
 
 

1966 births
Living people
German male rowers
People from Gütersloh
Sportspeople from Detmold (region)
Rowers at the 1992 Summer Olympics
Olympic rowers of Germany
World Rowing Championships medalists for West Germany
World Rowing Championships medalists for Germany
West German male rowers